Meadow Creek may refer to:

Communities
 Dixon Lane-Meadow Creek, California
 Meadow Creek, West Virginia

Streams
 Meadow Creek (Haw River tributary), a stream in Alamance County, North Carolina
 Meadow Creek (Rocky River tributary), a stream in Chatham County, North Carolina
 Meadow Creek (Millard County), in Utah
 Meadow Creek (New River), in West Virginia